Digitacalia is a genus of flowering plants in the daisy family.

 Species
All known species are endemic to Mexico
 Digitacalia chiapensis (Hemsl.) Pippen - Chiapas
 Digitacalia crypta B.L.Turner - Oaxaca
 Digitacalia hintoniorum B.L.Turner - Michoacán
 Digitacalia jatrophoides (Kunth) Pippen - Zacatecas, Jalisco, Michoacán, Guerrero, Oaxaca, Guanajuato, Colima
 Digitacalia napeifolia (DC.) Pippen - Oaxaca, Michoacán

 formerly included
 Digitacalia heteroidea (Klatt) Pippen - Synonym of Roldana heteroidea (Klatt) H.Rob. & Brettell

References

Senecioneae
Asteraceae genera
Endemic flora of Mexico